Alhazen's problem, also known as Alhazen's billiard problem, is a mathematical problem in geometrical optics first formulated by Ptolemy in 150 AD.
It is named for the 11th-century Arab mathematician Alhazen (Ibn al-Haytham) who presented a geometric solution in his Book of Optics.

Geometric formulation

The problem comprises drawing lines from two points, meeting at a third point on the circumference of a circle and making equal angles with the normal at that point (specular reflection). Thus, its main application in optics is to solve the problem, "Find the point on a spherical convex mirror at which a ray of light coming from a given point must strike in order to be reflected to another point." This leads to an equation of the fourth degree.
( Alhazen himself never used this algebraic rewriting of the problem)

Alhazen's solution

Ibn al-Haytham solved the problem using conic sections and a geometric proof.

Algebraic solution
Later mathematicians such as Christiaan Huygens, James Gregory, Guillaume de l'Hôpital, Isaac Barrow, and many others, attempted to find an algebraic solution to the problem, using various methods, including analytic methods of geometry and derivation by complex numbers.

An algebraic solution to the problem was finally found first in 1965 by Jack M. Elkin (an actuarian), by means of a quartic polynomial. 
Other solutions were rediscovered later: 
in 1989, by Harald Riede;
in 1990 (submitted in 1988), by Miller and Vegh;
and in 1992, by John D. Smith
and also by Jörg Waldvogel.

In 1997, the Oxford mathematician Peter M. Neumann proved there is no ruler-and-compass construction for the general solution of Alhazen's problem
(although in 1965 Elkin had already provided a counterexample to Euclidean construction).

Generalization
Recently, Mitsubishi Electric Research Labs researchers solved the extension of Alhazen's problem to general rotationally symmetric quadric mirrors including hyperbolic, parabolic and elliptical mirrors. They showed that the mirror reflection point can be computed by solving an eighth degree equation in the most general case. If the camera (eye) is placed on the axis of the mirror, the degree of the equation reduces to six. Alhazen's problem can also be extended to multiple refractions from a spherical ball. Given a light source and a spherical ball of certain refractive index, the closest point on the spherical ball where the light is refracted to the eye of the observer can be obtained by solving a tenth degree equation.

References 

Mathematical problems
Mathematics in the medieval Islamic world
Geometrical optics
Ibn al-Haytham